In computer science, the sign bit is a bit in a signed number representation that indicates the sign of a number.  Although only signed numeric data types have a sign bit, it is invariably located in the most significant bit position, so the term may be used interchangeably with "most significant bit" in some contexts.

Almost always, if the sign bit is 0, the number is non-negative (positive or zero).  If the sign bit is 1 then the number is negative, although formats other than two's complement integers allow a signed zero: distinct "positive zero" and "negative zero" representations, the latter of which does not correspond to the mathematical concept of a negative number.

In the two's complement representation, the sign bit has the weight  where  is the number of bits. In a sign-and-magnitude representation of numbers, the value of the sign bit determines whether the numerical value is positive or negative.

Floating-point numbers, such as IEEE format, IBM format, VAX format, and even the format used by the Zuse Z1 and Z3 use a sign-and-magnitude representation.

When using a complement representation, to convert a signed number to a wider format the additional bits must be filled with copies of the sign bit in order to preserve its numerical value, a process called sign extension or sign propagation.

References

Binary arithmetic
Computer arithmetic